Vlasti Emanuel Martinovic  (born 20 April 2004) is a Romanian professional footballer who plays as a centre-back for Liga I side Farul Constanța.

Club career

Farul Constanța
He made his league debut on 9 April 2022 in Liga I match against FC Argeș Pitești.

Career statistics

Club

References

External links
 
 

2004 births
Living people
Romanian people of Serbian descent
People from Orșova
Romanian footballers
Romania youth international footballers
Association football midfielders
Liga I players
FCV Farul Constanța players